Parfondeval is a commune in the Orne department in Normandy, northwestern France.

See also
Communes of the Orne department

References

Communes of Orne
Orne communes articles needing translation from French Wikipedia